Senecio leucanthemifolius is a plant common in sea-side in Mediterranean area.

Common names

Distribution
Native
Palearctic: 
Northern Africa: Algeria, Libya, Morocco, Tunisia
Western Asia: Palestine, Jordan, Lebanon, Syria, Turkey - Anatolia
Caucasus: Armenia, Azerbaijan, Georgia
East Europe: Saratov Oblast, Volgograd Oblast, Astrakhan Oblast, Rostov Oblast, Kalmykiya
Middle Europe: Hungary
Southwestern Europe: Balearic Islands, France, Spain
Southeastern Europe: Albania, Bosnia and Herzegovina, Bulgaria, Crete, Crimea, Croatia, Cyprus, Greece, Italy, Malta, Romania, Sardinia, Serbia, Sicily, Ukraine

References

External links

leucanthemifolius
Flora of Europe
Flora of Asia
Flora of North Africa